Lucy O'Brien (born 1964) is a British philosopher and the Richard Wollheim Professor of Philosophy at University College London.

O'Brien predominantly works in the philosophy of mind and action, focusing in particular on self-consciousness and self-knowledge. She is the author of Self-Knowing Agents (OUP 2007) and co-editor, with Matthew Soteriou, of Mental Actions (OUP 2009).

O'Brien has co-edited the philosophical journal MIND with A. W. Moore since September 2015.  She is the first female editor of MIND in its 140-year history. She was elected Chair of Trustees of The Royal Institute of Philosophy in 2020, and was recipient of a Humboldt Research Award in 2022.

References

External links
 https://www.ucl.ac.uk/philosophy/people/permanent-academic-staff/lucy-o-brien

Living people
Philosophers of mind
1964 births
British women philosophers
Philosophy journal editors
Mind (journal) editors